The Musée Cernuschi ('Cernuschi Museum'), officially also the  ('Asian Arts Museum of the City of Paris'), is an Asian art museum located at 7 avenue Vélasquez, near Parc Monceau, in Paris, France. Its Asian art collection is second in Paris only to that of the Musée Guimet.

The nearest Paris Métro stops to the museum are Villiers or Monceau on Line 2.

History

The museum was founded in 1898 by Henri Cernuschi (1821–1896) in the mansion that used to be his home. It describes itself as the second-oldest Asian art museum in France, and the fifth-oldest Chinese art museum in Europe.

Following a major renovation project from 2001 to 2005, during which the museum was closed, its total exhibition space reached 3,200 m2. Another renovation was conducted in 2019–2020.

On , the Cernuschi Museum became part of the public institution Paris Musées, together with 13 other museums belonging to the City of Paris.

Collections

Over the years, the museum's collection has gradually grown from nearly 5,000 objects initially to about 15,000 as of 2021. Originally its collections were overwhelmingly of objects from China and Japan, which have been complemented more recently by artefacts from Korea and Vietnam. Some 900 objects are on permanent exhibition. Most prominent is the large Buddha of Meguro, a Japanese bronze from the 18th century, from the original collection of Henri Cernuschi. Other permanent exhibits include:

 a fine collection of archaic bronze pieces (15th to 3rd centuries BCE)
 Han dynasty objects (206 BCE – 220 CE)
 Funerary statues from the Northern Wei dynasty (386–534 CE) and Sui dynasty (581–618 CE)
 Tang dynasty statues (618–907 CE)
 Ceramics from the Tang and Song dynasties (6th through 13th centuries CE)
 funerary masks in gilded bronze dating from the Liao dynasty (907–1125)

See also 
 Chinese Museum (Fontainebleau)
 List of museums in Paris

Notes

References 

 Cernuschi Museum official website (French, English, Chinese, Japanese)
 Paris Musées official website
 Marie-Thérèse Bobot, The Chinese Collections of the Cernuschi Museum: General Guide, Paris-Musées, 1993. .
 Waldemar George, "Art in Paris: The Cernuschi Museum", The Burlington Magazine for Connoisseurs, Vol. 50, No. 290 (May, 1927), pp. 283–284.
 Vadime Elisseeff, Bronzes Archaïques Chinois Au Musée Cernuschi (Archaic Chinese Bronzes), L'Asiathèque, 1977.
Cernuschi Museum feature on Paris Walking Tours website

Asian art museums in France
Asian-French culture
Cernuschi
Buildings and structures in the 8th arrondissement of Paris
Art museums established in 1898
1898 establishments in France
Paris Musées